The P.T. Barnum Series in Entertainment is an annual ceremony honoring alumni of Tufts University for their work in the field of media and entertainment. The show alternates between New York City and Los Angeles, respectively titled "From Ballou to Broadway" and "From the Hill to Hollywood."

The series began as a 2005 collaboration of The Hill to Hollywood Network of the Los Angeles Tufts Alliance, the Film and Media Studies Program (FMS) at Tufts University, and the Theatre, Dance, and Performance Studies Department (TDPS) and the Tufts Office of Alumni Relations in celebration of P.T. Barnum’s love of entertainment and creativity, and the desire to honor members of the Tufts 
community for their advancement of and success within the media and entertainment industries.  The 2015 P.T. Barnum Series expanded the ceremony's focus to include celebrating younger, up-and-coming Tufts alumni working in these industries through the inaugural P.T. Barnum Young Alumni Showcase.

From the Hill to Hollywood 2019
Young Alumni Showcase:
Sam Cantor, musician
Cinthia Chen, creator and director, Ben Haven Taylor, film designer and director of photography, and Eli Lloyd, producer/comedian, "Anna May Wong, The Actress who Died a Thousand Deaths"
Benjamin Hosking, filmmaker
Allentza Michel, artist and community organizer 
Emcee:
Barbara Wallace Grossman, professor of theatre and interim chair of the department of theatre, dance, and performance studies
Panel Moderator: 
Adam Felber, writer, actor, and radio personality

From Ballou to Broadway 2018
Award recipients:
 Judy Bowman, casting director
 David Gelles, producer
 Andrew Polk, actor
 Joshua Seftel, filmmaker, producer
Keynote:
 Robert O'Hara, playwright

From the Hill to Hollywood 2017
Award recipients:
 Julie Dubiner, dramaturg
 Deke Sharon, vocal producer, arranger, and vocalist for Pitch Perfect, The Sing Off and Pitch Slapped
 Joel Bishoff, Director, I Love You, You're Perfect, Now Change
 Justine Shapiro, Documentary filmmaker and travel television host
Keynote:
 Hank Azaria, actor

From Ballou to Broadway 2016
Young Alumni Showcase:
 Rebecca Baumwoll, David Jenkins, Joel Perez, Broken Box Mime Theater
 Allison Benko, director, and Grace Oberhofer, composer
 Andrew Mulherkar and Jason Yeager, jazz musicians 
 J. Faye Yuan, screenwriter and interactive documentarian
Emcees:
 Lisa Lax and Nancy Stern of Lookalike Productions

From the Hill to Hollywood 2015
Keynote:
 Albert Berger, film producer
Young Alumni Showcase:
 Noam Ash and Austin Bening, creators of the web TV series My Gay Roommate
 Madeline Blue, actor
 Elyssa Dru Rosenberg, choreographer
 Brett Weiner, screenwriter, producer, and cofounder of Screen Junkies

From Ballou to Broadway 2014
Award recipients:
 David Costabile, actor
 Robert O'Hara, playwright
 Michael Dobbs, author
Emcee:
 Neal Shapiro, media executive

From the Hill to Hollywood 2013
Award recipients:
 Coral Hawthorne, producer
 Christopher Brown, art director and production designer
 Brian Koppelman, screenwriter and director
Emcee:
 Deke Sharon, arranger, producer, and performer

From Ballou to Broadway 2012

Award recipients:
 Betsy Gregory, dancer and Artistic Director, Dance Umbrella
 Marian Porges, Senior Director, NBC News
 Jonathan Hadary, actor
 Gregory Maguire, writer
Emcee:
 Charles Cermele, producer and performer

From the Hill to Hollywood 2011 
Award recipients:
 Hank Azaria, actor, director, comedian
 David Rone, President, Time Warner Cable Sports
 Prudence Fraser Sternin and Robert Sternin, television and stage writers and producers
 Gary Winick, director and producer
Emcees:
 Jeff Greenstein, television writer and producer
 Jeff Strauss, television writer and producer

From Ballou to Broadway 2010
Award recipients:
 Oliver Platt, actor
 Lisa Lax and Nancy Stern, directors, producers and co-founders, Lookalike Productions
 Art Bridgman, choreographer, Bridgman/Packer Dance
Emcees:
 Hank Azaria, actor, director, comedian
 Joel Bishoff, director

From the Hill to Hollywood 2009

Award recipients:
 Jeff Greenstein, television writer and producer
 Andrea Nelson Meigs, talent agent, Creative Artists Agency
Emcee:
 Adam Felber, political satirist and radio personality

From Ballou to Broadway 2008

Award recipients:
 Jim Nicola,  Artistic Director, New York Theatre Workshop
 Albert Berger, producer, Little Miss Sunshine and Cold Mountain
 Neal Shapiro, President and CEO, New York public media provider WNET
Emcee:
 Rob Burnett, Executive Producer, Late Show with David Letterman

From the Hill to Hollywood 2007
Award recipients:
 Steve Tisch, producer, Risky Business and Forrest Gump
 Ben Silverman, Co-President and Executive Producer, Universal Media Studios 
 Seamus Blackley, Creative Artists Agency talent agent and Xbox designer

From Ballou to Broadway 2006
Award recipients:
 Donald Byrd, Tony Award nominated choreographer and Spectrum Dance Theater Artistic Director 
 Dan Hedaya, actor
 Mary Louise Geiger, NYU Tisch School of the Arts faculty member and founder of Mary Louise Geiger Lighting design
 Rob Burnett, Executive Producer, Late Show with David Letterman
 Meredith Vieira, Co- Host of Today and Host of Who Wants to Be a Millionaire

From the Hill to Hollywood 2005
Award recipients:
 Peter Gallagher, actor
 Cary Granat, founder and CEO, Walden Media
 Courtenay Valenti, Executive Vice President, Warner Brothers Pictures
 Jon Levin, literary agent, Creative Artists Agency
 Ameesha Patel, Bollywood actress

References

Tufts University